89=99 is the first Compilation album by Mexican pop singer Aleks Syntek, released on October 24, 1999. It was certified Double Platinum in Mexico.

Track listing

Personnel 
Aleks Syntek – vocals

Sales and certifications

References

1999 compilation albums
1999 albums
Aleks Syntek compilation albums